Ralf Meister (born 5 January 1962 in Hamburg-Neugraben) is a German Lutheran theologian, former General Superintendent (regional bishop) of Berlin, and Landesbischof of the Evangelical-Lutheran Church of Hanover.

Meister studied at the University of Hamburg and the Hebrew University of Jerusalem Theology and Jewish Studies. He was ordained at St. Michaelis Church, Hamburg on 28 May 1992. In September 2001 he became Provost of the Lübeck district of the North Elbian Evangelical Lutheran Church. On Pentecost 2008 he was invested as General Superintendent of Berlin at the Kaiser Wilhelm Memorial Church, succeeding Martin-Michael Passauer, who retired. On 25 November 2010 the Synod of the Evangelical-Lutheran Church of Hanover elected Meister as Landesbischof, winning 64 of 76 votes in the second round. Meister's investment as bishop will be held at the Marktkirche in Hanover on 26 March 2011. He succeeded Margot Käßmann who stepped down as Landesbischof on 24 February 2010.

On 22 January 2005 he gave the "Wort zum Sonntag" on the German national television for the first time.

Ralf Meister is married to Dagmar Ulrich-Meister and has three children, Juval, Lotta and Tom-Lasse.

References

Living people
German Lutheran theologians
1962 births
People from Harburg, Hamburg
Hebrew University of Jerusalem alumni
University of Hamburg alumni
21st-century Lutheran bishops
German male non-fiction writers
21st-century German Lutheran bishops